Ranchi is a city in the state of Jharkhand in India.

Ranchi can also refer to:

 Ranchi University, a premier Indian University
 Ranchi district, a district in the Indian state of Jharkhand
 Ranchi Rhinos, Hockey India League team based in Ranchi
 SS Ranchi, a British ocean liner

See also 
 Ranchy
 Raunchy (disambiguation)